Fabulous Boys (Chinese: 原來是美男) is a 2013 Taiwanese drama starring Lyan Cheng, Jiro Wang, Hwang In Deok, and Evan Yo. It is a remake of the South Korean drama You're Beautiful, which first aired in 2009. It is also known as You're Beautiful Taiwan Version, You're Beautiful, He's Beautiful, Yuan Lai Shi Mei Nan.

Cast

Main cast

A.N.JELL 

 Jiro Wang as Huang Tai Jing (黃泰京)
 Lyan Cheng as Gao Mei Nu 高美女 / Gao Mei Nan 高美男
 Pets Tseng as Gao Mei Nan 高美男 (Background Cover)
 Hwang In Deok as Jiang Xin Yu 姜新禹
 Evan Yo as Jeremy

Supporting cast 

 Jenna Wang (王思平) as Liu Xin Ning 柳心凝
 Chen Wei Min as Mark 馬克
 Bao Wei Ming (包偉銘) as An Shi Jie 安士杰
 Lily Tien as Mu Hua Lan 慕華蘭
 Zhang Qin Yan (張沁妍) as Ke Ti 可蒂
 Renzo Liu as Jin Da Pai 金大牌
 Nylon Chen as Gao Cai Yin
 Da Mu (大目) as Dancing instructor
 Amanda as Fan club president
 Xia Yu Xin (夏語心/寶咖咖) as Fan
 Riva Chang as Fan
 Gao Yu Shan (高玉珊) as Gao Mei Ci 高美慈
 Huang Yi Jia (黃一嘉) as Assistant Lin 林秘書
 Xia Yu Xin (夏語心) as Ding Ya Zi 丁亞姿
 Park Shin Hye as Go Mi-nam/Go Mi-nyeo [Korean Gao Mei Nu] (ep1)
 Luo Hong Zheng as himself (ep1)(SpeXial)
 Sam Lin as himself (ep1)(SpeXial)
 Xu Ming Jie as himself (ep1)(SpeXial)
 Huang Wei Jin as himself (ep1)(SpeXial)
 Tia Lee as herself (ep1)(Dream Girls)
 Puff Kuo as herself (ep1)(Dream Girls)
 Emily Song (宋米秦) as herself (ep1)(Dream Girls)

Soundtrack

Broadcast

References

External links 
  
  

Formosa Television original programming
Gala Television original programming
2013 Taiwanese television series debuts
2013 Taiwanese television series endings
Musical television series
Taiwanese television series based on South Korean television series